Czech Crown/crown can refer to:
the currency of the Czech Republic, see Czech koruna
loosely to:
Lands of the Bohemian Crown
the crown of St. Wenceslas, see Crown of Saint Wenceslas